Patrick Bérard (born 10 December 1959) is a French sprint canoer who competed in the early 1980s. At the 1980 Summer Olympics in Moscow, he finished sixth in the K-4 1000 m event.

References

External links
Sports-Reference.com profile

1959 births
Canoeists at the 1980 Summer Olympics
French male canoeists
Living people
Olympic canoeists of France
Place of birth missing (living people)
20th-century French people